Paul Howard (born 6 January 1971) is an Irish journalist, author and comedy writer.  He is best known as the creator of the cult character Ross O'Carroll-Kelly, a fictional Dublin 4 "rugby jock".

Life
Howard was born 6 January 1971 in London.  He worked for sixteen years as a journalist, mostly for The Sunday Tribune, first in news and later as one of Ireland's most respected sportswriters. He was chief sportswriter of The Sunday Tribune and one of the first to question the achievements of Michelle Smith de Bruin. He covered two Olympics, a World Cup and numerous major sporting events. He was named Sports Journalist of the Year in the 1998 Irish Media Awards for an investigation into eating disorders among Irish athletes and an interview with the disgraced former sprinter, Ben Johnson. He was shortlisted for the award in 2002, 2003 and 2004.

Howard is the creator of the "rugby jock" character Ross O'Carroll-Kelly, whose exploits have been the subject of twenty-one novels and three other books that have sold over 1.5 million copies in Ireland. He was named National Newspapers of Ireland Columnist of the Year in 2013 for his weekly column in The Irish Times on Saturday written under the Ross O'Carroll-Kelly pseudonym.

He is also the author of four plays – The Last Days of the Celtic Tiger in 2007, and Between Foxrock and a Hard Place in 2010, and Breaking Dad in 2014 and Postcards from the Ledge in 2017   – as well as the hugely successful 2012 puppet-based Anglo the Musical and a second musical Copper Face Jacks: The Musical, based on the popular nightclub Copper Face Jacks, in 2018.

His first non-Ross-related venture into fiction: Triggs – The Autobiography of Roy Keane's Dog – was a #1 Bestseller in 2012, and short-listed for an Irish Book Award.

He has written several nonfiction books, including The Joy, an account of life in Mountjoy Prison, The Gaffers: Mick McCarthy, Roy Keane and the Team they Built, an account of the McCarthy–Keane clash during the run-up to the 2002 World Cup. He also ghostwrote the autobiographies of boxer Steve Collins (Celtic Warrior) and broadcaster George Hook ("Time Added On").

He is the author of the biography of Tara Browne, "I Read the News Today, Oh Boy", published in October 2016.

He has written a children’s book called “Aldrin Adams and the Cheese Nightmares” and has also co-written three children's books with former Ireland rugby player Gordon D'Arcy called “Gordon's Game”, “Gordon’s Game: Blue Thunder” and “Gordon’s Game: Lions Roar”.

Awards and recognition
Howard is a record four-time Irish Book Award winner, collecting the Best Popular Fiction prize in 2007 for Should Have Got Off at Sydney Parade, in 2010 for The Oh My God Delusion, in 2013 for Downturn Abbey (each parts of the Ross O'Carroll-Kelly series) and Non-Fiction Book of the Year in 2016 for the biography of Tara Browne, "I Read the News Today, Oh Boy". He has written comedy for radio and television and was part of the writing teams for two series of two RTÉ comedy sketch shows in the autumns of 2012 and 2013, Irish Pictorial Weekly and The Mario Rosenstock Show. He also appeared in a number of sketches in Irish Pictorial Weekly.  Irish Pictorial Weekly  was twice nominated for an Irish Film and Television Award.

In September 2019, he was the subject of an hour long RTÉ documentary entitled “We Need to Talk about Ross” produced by Adrian McCarthy of Wildfire Films.

References

1971 births
Living people
Writers from London
The Irish Times people
Sunday Tribune people
Irish comedy writers
21st-century Irish novelists
21st-century Irish male writers